Samar Dasht may refer to:
 Samar Dasht, Khondab
 Samar Dasht, Tafresh